Alliances is a fantasy novel by Paul B. Thompson and Tonya C. Cook, set in the world of Dragonlance, and based on the Dungeons & Dragons role-playing game. It is the second novel in the "Elven Exiles" series. It was published in paperback in October 2006.

Plot summary
The Elven Exiles struggle for survival in the distant kingdom of Khur; the elves remaining in Qualinesti face persecution, enslavement, and extermination; Kerianseray, the Lioness, Kagonesti general and wife of Speaker Gilthas, is magically transported from Khur to equally dangerous circumstances in her former homeland.

Reception

References

2006 novels
Dragonlance novels